Meka Suri 2 is Indian Telugu-language crime and thriller-based original web film directed by Trinadh Velisila. The film was digitally released on 27 November 2020 on ZEE5. Producer by Karthik Kancherla under the production house 1725 Studio & Simba Entertainment. Starring with Abhinay Reddy, Naresh Byreddy, Lirisha & Sumaya Syed.

Meka Suri 2 is a sequel of Meka Suri released on 31 July 2020.

Synopsis 
The story starts with a time-lapse of 20 years. Suri is now the most wanted criminal. Top cop Arjun is assigned the case to trace and put Suri behind the bars. But the only information Arjun has of Suri is that he was shot dead years ago. Arjun does not even know how Suri looks now or where he is. He goes to Raghuram in search of clues but in vain. He gets to know the entire revenge story and also the reason for Suri to become the most wanted criminal.

After great efforts, Arjun can track Suri. Arjun tries to trap Suri through a sting operation, however, it backfires on Arjun. Suri is too smart for Arjun and Suri throws an open challenge to Arjun by giving him names of the people he is going to kill. He challenges him to stop him if he can! Despite Arjun's perfect planning, Suri outsmarts Arjun again!

But finally, Arjun finds a loophole of Suri. Arjun finds out that Suri has killed an innocent man unknowingly! And that man's 15-year-old son wants to take an act of revenge with Suri. Arjun makes him realize that the path of killings has never taken anyone to the right path, it always ends badly. Suri realizes and surrenders.

Cast 

 Abhinay Reddy as Meka Suri
 Syed Sumaya Farahath as Rani
Sharath Kumar as Appal Naidu
 Dr Pramod Kumar as ACP Arjun
 Byreddy Naresh as Veerabhadram
 Sharavan Sai Tadinada as Raghuram
Lirisha

Releases 
ZEE5 announced that the film will be released digitally on their platform on 27 November 2020.

Reception

Critical reviews 
IndiaGlitz reviewer team has given 2.5/5 stars to this raw narration web film stating that it is a clash between a cop and a vigilante. How brutalization can change lives and how a cop rages against jungle justice is the crux. Background music, cinematography and the technical department have executed output within a restriction. Acting of Abhinay as Suri was smooth and easy while others have done a decent justice.

123Telugu reviewer team has given 2.5/5 stars to this web film stating that it has worked in bits and pieces. Criticized further that it has a good setup and realistic performances. Impressive scenes, however, movie pace was slow. People who like rustic action and drama films can opt for this film otherwise it is easy to opt-out.

Sajid Ali from LetsOTT has given 1/5 stars to this film which is an overconfident that rides high on the deluded success of its predecessor. Criticized that it is total waste of time, poorly rendered prosthetics and make-up was not up to the mark. He did not liked the background score and the cinematography of the web film.

Binged reviewer team had given 0.75/5 stars stating that it is a boring and atrociously banal level revenge drama. Performance of Abhinav was depicted as angry from the start as personality, Dr Pramod had some resemblance with his character. Overall writing, story and editing was not up to the mark. And it is unenjoyable & unrecommendable web film.

References

External links 

 
 Meka Suri 2 on ZEE5